Émile-Dostaler O'Leary (16 August 1908 – 18 April 1965) was a Canadian journalist and writer.

Biography
Émile-Dostaler O'Leary O'Leary was born in Berthierville, Quebec and attended the  Collège Saint-Joseph in Berthierville before travelling to Belgium to study at the Petit Séminaire de Basse-Wavre and, later, the University of Burgundy (Dijon, France) and Université Libre de Bruxelles.  He completed a B.Sc. degree in chemistry, physics, and mathematics at the Institut de chimie Meurice.

After returning from Europe, O'Leary completed an internship in the chemical industry from 1933 to 1937.  He subsequently pursued journalism and joined La Patrie.  He  worked at La Patrie until 1957, when he became director of Air France's Department of External Relations—a position he held until 1958. In 1959, he began working as a correspondent for the Canadian Broadcasting Corporation in Paris, where he also served as Canadian correspondent for several French language newspapers.

Activism
O'Leary was a Quebec nationalist and member of Jeune-Canada. With his brother Walter-Patrice, he co-founded the Young Patriots of French Canada and the Knights of the  Round Table of Canada in 1935, and the Cultural Union of Mexico–French Canada, which was later renamed the Union of Latin America, in 1939.

During the Canadian federal election of 1945, he stood as  a candidate for the Bloc Populaire Canadien in the Laurier riding.  He placed second in the contest with 5,145 votes, losing to incumbent Liberal Ernest Bertrand.

O'Leary was a representative to the executive of the International Federation of Journalists and, in 1950, founded the International Francophone Press Union (UPF).

He served as the UPF's president from 1950 to 1955. He also involved himself with the formation of the Canadian Union of French-language Journalists.

Personal life
O'Leary was born to Émile O'Leary and Fébronie Dostaler and had two sisters—Marguerite and Alice—and a brother, Walter-Patrice. He married Lucille Lévesque on 15 April 1939, at the age of 30. He fathered four children: Marie-France, Denis, Étienne O'Leary, and Véronique. 
O'Leary died on 18 April 1965 in Paris, aged 56, from undisclosed causes.

Publications

 L'"inferiority complex", 1935 (English translation: The "inferiority complex")
 Séparatisme, doctrine constructive, 1936 (English translation: Separatism: a constructive doctrine)
 Jeunes du Québec et France d'aujourd'hui, 1941 (English translation: Youth of Quebec and France today)
 Introduction à l'histoire de l'Amérique latine, 1949 (English translation: Introduction to the history of Latin America)
 Le roman canadien-français : étude historique et critique. Montreal: Le Cercle du Livre de France, 1954. (English translation: The French-Canadian novel: A historical and critical study)

References

Canadian male non-fiction writers
Canadian non-fiction writers in French
Journalists from Quebec
People from Lanaudière
Writers from Quebec
1908 births
1965 deaths
20th-century Canadian non-fiction writers
20th-century Canadian male writers